Linda Winikow (May 9, 1940 – August 24, 2008) was an American politician from New York. Winikow pleaded guilty  to grand larceny, commercial bribe receiving and making illegal campaign contributions.

Early life 
On May 9, 1940, Winikow was born as Linda Bord in New York City. Winikow's family lived in Hewlett, Nassau County, New York.

Education 
Winikow graduated from Hofstra University. Then she taught history at a high school in Long Island.

Career 
Winikow entered politics as a Democrat, and became a member of the Town of Ramapo Zoning Board of Appeals in 1968; a member of the Ramapo Town Council in 1972; and a member of the Rockland County Legislature in 1974.

Winikow was a member of the New York State Senate from 1975 to 1984, sitting in the 181st, 182nd,183rd, 184th and 185th New York State Legislatures. She was a delegate to the 1980 Democratic National Convention but in June 1984, she announced that she would not seek re-election.

In 1979, the Supersisters trading card set was produced and distributed; card number 22 featured Winikow's name and picture.

On July 1, 1984, Winikow became the Vice President of Orange and Rockland Utilities's public relations. On August 16, 1993, she was arrested, and accused of funneling more than $250,000 of the company's money away for corrupt purposes and her personal use.  Investigations showed that she had paid local newspapers to refrain from publishing articles with undesired coverage of Orange and Rockland Utilities and the company's top employees; that she forced the utility's advertising company to pay kickbacks; and that she made contributions to the election campaigns, using the company's money but declaring it as coming from different sources. On October 6, 1993, she pleaded guilty in Rockland County Court to grand larceny, commercial bribe receiving and making illegal campaign contributions. In 1995, she was sentenced to nine months in the Rockland county jail.

Personal life 
Winikow's husband was Arnold Winikow (1936–2000). In 1964, Winikow and her family moved to Spring Valley, New York, Rockland County, in 1964. Her favorite grandchild was Anna Winikow.

Winikow died on August 24, 2008, in Sarasota, Florida at the age of 68.

References

External links 
 Linda Winikow at ourcampaigns.com

1940 births
2008 deaths
County legislators in New York (state)
Hofstra University alumni
People from Sarasota, Florida
People from Spring Valley, New York
Democratic Party New York (state) state senators
Women state legislators in New York (state)
20th-century American politicians
20th-century American women politicians
21st-century American women